"Son of My Father" is a song popularised in 1972 by Chicory Tip.

The song was originally published in German as "Nachts scheint die Sonne" (In the Night Shines the Sun), written by Giorgio Moroder with German lyrics by Michael Holm in 1971, and English lyrics by Pete Bellotte. The German version "Nachts scheint die Sonne" by Michael Holm was released in 1971, while Giorgio Moroder also released the English version "Son of My Father" under the moniker Giorgio.  However, Giorgio's version failed to chart in the UK. The song was released by Chicory Tip in 1972 and this version reached No. 1 on the UK single chart in February 1972.

Since its release, the tune of the chorus of "Son of My Father" has been regularly used on the terraces of British football grounds for football chants.

Chicory Tip's version
A copy of Giorgio's version found its way to studio manager Roger Easterby who then persuaded the British band Chicory Tip to record it. The song, produced by Easterby and Des Champ, was recorded on Christmas Eve 1971 in the studio of George Martin. The song is notable as the first UK number one single to prominently feature a synthesizer, in this case a Moog synthesizer, programmed by Chris Thomas. The B side of the single is "Pride Comes Before A Fall". The song reached No. 1 on the UK Singles Chart for three weeks in February 1972.
The band released the song in the US under the shortened name Chicory, but it only reached No. 91 on the Billboard Hot 100.

The Chicory Tip version includes audibly different lyrics to those written by Bellotte and recorded by Moroder, although it is unclear why, but it may be down to misheard lyrics on the part of vocalist Peter Hewson. The band re-recorded the song in 2000 (with Rick Foster on vocals), this time with the correct lyrics as sung by Moroder.

Charts

Weekly charts

Year-end charts

Giorgio Moroder's version
Moroder's original version, recorded before Chicory Tip's version, was first released in Germany in 1971 under the name Giorgio as the 'B' side of "I'm Free Now", and later released as an 'A'-side single in 1972. It reached No. 47 in Germany in 1972. The song however failed to chart on its release in the UK.  In the US, the song peaked at No. 34 for two weeks on the US Cashbox pop charts, and slightly lower at No. 46 on Billboard Hot 100 in April 1972, but performing better than Chicory Tip's version which was released in the US around the same time.

In Chicago, WLS playlisted only Giorgio's version, for about a month, peaking at No. 23 on 27 March 1972, whereas rival WCFL charted only Chicory Tip's version (as by Chicory), for about  months, peaking at No. 9 on 20 April 1972.

Charts

Other versions

The German version, "Nachts scheint die Sonne", was recorded with Michael Holm on vocals.  The song was released in 1971 and this reached No. 29 in September 1971 in Germany. The next year, Finnish musician Danny recorded a Finnish-language version, "Maantieltä taloon" (From the road to the house), released as the B side to "Vai Niin, Vai Niin" (Finnish version of Mouth & MacNeal's "How Do You Do").

In popular culture
The tune of the chorus of "Son of My Father" has been used on the terraces of British football grounds for football chants, for example "Oh Man United, the only English team to win the European Cup", and the anthem for Teddy Sheringham that started with "Oh Teddy, Teddy ...". And at Leyton Orient it is used for the chant "Oh, Ori Ori, Ori Ori Ori Ori Orient"

It is often heard by supporters of Macclesfield FC (formerly Macclesfield Town) as "Oh Maccy Maccy, Maccy Maccy Maccy Maccy Macclesfield!".

The tune has also been popular at cricket grounds, notably with fans of Lancashire County Cricket Club in England - "Oh, Lanky Lanky, Lanky Lanky Lanky Lanky Lancashire!"

It has also been used as a chant by supporters of Tommy Robinson, as "Oh, Tommy Tommy, Tommy Tommy Tommy Tommy Robinson".

But most notably it was used by supporters of Peterborough United from 1985 to 1987 to pay homage to their striker Jackie Gallagher, as "Oh, Jackie, Jackie, Jackie, Jackie, Jackie, Jackie Gallagher"

In the 1970s and 1980s, the synthesizer solo from this song was used in the public Polish TV as an intro to sport magazines.  The song was used in Life on Mars series 2 in 2007. In the first season of the Netflix show, Master of None, Son of my Father is the played at the end of episode 2 entitled, The Parents.

In the 1990's UK band Denim, led by former Felt frontman Lawrence recorded a song entitled "On A Chicory Tip", the principal lyric content of which was "We're on a tip, oh yeah", sung to the song's main synthesizer riff.

The 2004 novel Fleshmarket Close by Scots crime-fiction writer Ian Rankin includes a reference to the song: a fellow police officer speaks to Rankin's serial-central-character Detective Inspector John Rebus of a suspect whose late father had been a prominent gangster as "his father's son"; to this, Rebus says "Chicory Tip"; to the other officer's "quizzical look" Rebus then says "They had a big hit with Son of My Father... before your time, though."

References

External links
 .

UK Singles Chart number-one singles
1972 songs
Giorgio Moroder songs
Songs written by Pete Bellotte
Songs written by Giorgio Moroder
Songs about fathers